James Thomas Mahoney  (born May 26, 1934) is a former Major League Baseball shortstop. He was signed by the Philadelphia Phillies before the 1953 season and played for the Boston Red Sox (1959), Washington Senators (1961), Cleveland Indians (1962) and Houston Astros (1965).

Mahoney was the first player to appear as a pinch runner in modern Washington Senators history.  On April 10, 1961, in the bottom of the ninth inning, he entered the game for second baseman Danny O'Connell, who had singled with one out. He reached second on an R. C. Stevens grounder to third, but did not score, as the next batter made the third out. The Senators lost to the Chicago White Sox, 4-3.

Other career highlights include:
one 3-hit game...three singles and two runs scored in a 9-4 victory over the Detroit Tigers (May 11, 1961)
a home run vs. the New York Yankees in front of 70,918 fans at Cleveland Stadium (June 17, 1962)
hit a combined .381 (8-for-21) against All-Stars Eddie Fisher, Mike Fornieles, Mudcat Grant, and Dave Stenhouse

Mahoney had a career .966 fielding percentage and a batting average of .229 with 4 home runs, 15 RBI, and a slugging percentage of .314 in 210 at bats.  He scored 32 runs in 120 games.

After his playing career, he was a Major League coach for the Chicago White Sox (1972–76) and Seattle Mariners (1985–86), and managed in the farm systems of the White Sox, Pittsburgh Pirates and Minnesota Twins.

External links

Retrosheet

1934 births
Living people
Amarillo Sonics players
Appleton Foxes players
Baseball coaches from New Jersey
Baseball players from New Jersey
Bluefield Blue-Grays players
Boston Red Sox players
Bradford Phillies players
Chicago White Sox coaches
Cleveland Indians players
Columbus Jets players
Corning Red Sox players
Hawaii Islanders players
Houston Astros players
Indianapolis Indians players
Louisville Colonels (minor league) players
Major League Baseball shortstops
Minneapolis Millers (baseball) players
People from Englewood, New Jersey
Portland Beavers managers
Salisbury Rocots players
San Francisco Seals (baseball) players
San Jose Red Sox players
Seattle Angels players
Seattle Mariners coaches
Sportspeople from Bergen County, New Jersey
Tucson Toros players
Washington Senators (1961–1971) players